The Agence nationale de sécurité (ANS) is the intelligence agency of the Republic of Chad. It is the successor of the Documentation and Security Directorate (DDS) which was created by the former President Hissène Habré. The current director is Kogri Ahmed, who was appointed May 2013 by President Idriss Déby. While the ANS was not created as a law enforcement agency (those duties instead being done by the National Gendarmerie) they were given powers of arrest in 2017.

Activities 
The ANS has been active in fighting against Boko Haram.

Criticism 
The ANS has been accused of human rights violations, continuing the legacy left by the former DDS that it replaced. Those detained by the ANS are unable to contact their family members or their lawyers, and frequently nobody is aware of their detention. Critics maintain that the ANS is used as an armed wing of Déby's Patriotic Salvation Movement rather than an independent organization focused on counter-terrorism.

References 

Intelligence agencies
Law enforcement agencies in Africa
Law enforcement in Chad